Thomas Weiland (born October 24, 1951) is a German physicist, engineer and university lecturer. He is Professor of Electrical Engineering at the Department of Electrical Engineering and Information Technology of the Technische Universität Darmstadt in Germany. He was named a Fellow of the Institute of Electrical and Electronics Engineers (IEEE) in 2012 for his development of the finite integration technique and impact of the associated software on electromagnetic engineering.

Life 
Thomas Weiland went to the humanistic Ludwigsgymnasium in Saarbrücken. From 1970 to 1975 he studied theoretical electrical engineering at the Technische Hochschule Darmstadt (TH Darmstadt). He then worked as a research assistant at the Department of Fundamentals of Electrical Engineering at the TH Darmstadt. Weiland received his doctorate in 1977 from TH Darmstadt. After his doctorate he was a Fellow at CERN and a member of the theory group of the ISR Division. He habilitated in experimental physics at the University of Hamburg in 1984.

In 1989, he was appointed to the chair of Electromagnetic Field Theory at the Technische Universität Darmstadt. In 1994, he spent a research semester at Stanford University and in 1997 at the University of Victoria in Canada.

In 2011, he was appointed Chairman of the Committee for Accelerator Physics (KfB).

In 2016, it became known that Weiland would donate millions to the Department of Electrical Engineering and Information Technology at the TU Darmstadt.

Work 
Thomas Weiland deals with the theory of electromagnetic fields, numerical methods, accelerator physics as well as computer simulation and modelling.

In 2014, the Thomas-Weiland-Foundation was founded at the TU Darmstadt. The purpose of the foundation is to promote young scientists in MINT subjects, i.e. subjects related to mathematics, computer science, natural sciences and technology. The foundation supports master students at the TU Darmstadt.

Awards 

 1986 Physics Prize of the Deutsche Physikalische Gesellschaft (German Physical Society)
 1986 US Accel. Prize for Achievements in Accelerator Physics and Technology
 1988 Gottfried Wilhelm Leibniz Prize
 2004 Honorary Professor at Tongji University, Shanghai
2014 Admission to acatech - German Academy of Science and Engineering

External links 

 His website at the Technische Universität Darmstadt
 Website of the Thomas-Weiland-Foundation

References 

Fellow Members of the IEEE
Living people
Academic staff of Technische Universität Darmstadt
Technische Universität Darmstadt alumni
People associated with CERN
1951 births
Academic staff of the University of Hamburg